The Blue, Red and Gold Letter Edition of the Holy Bible, or BRG Bible, is a version of the King James Bible translation of the Bible which describes itself as 'an advancement of the “Red Letter” Bible popular among many for over 110 years'.

Red letter bibles traditionally printed the words spoken by Jesus, commonly only while he was on the Earth, in red letters. The BRG Bible is an outgrowth of the Red Letter Edition German-born entrepreneur and philanthropist Louis Klopsch published in 1901. It highlights the words of Jesus in red, owing to the color of blood. The BRG Bible uses blue ink for the spoken, quotable words of God the Father, red for the spoken words of Jesus and gold for references to the Holy Spirit. Additionally, words of Angels (and other Divine beings) are underlined in Blue in both OT/NT and Messianic Prophecies/Indicators of Jesus Christ are underlined in Red in OT.

An example of this coloring can be found in 1 John 5:7 where Father appears in Blue and Holy Ghost appears in Gold:

This edition was created by Scott Johnson, the preacher for the East Faulkner Church of Christ in El Dorado, Arkansas, and published by BRG Bible Ministries.

Additional versions of the BRG Bible include a New Testament Only and Spanish Reina Valera.

Online Editions

Available at http://brgbible.com/ and at BibleGateway.com.

Google Books Edition at Google Books.

Barnes & Noble Nook Edition at BarnesandNobel.com

Kindle Edition available at Amazon.com

An E-Sword Bible Module of the BRG Bible is available as a free download.

References

Bible versions and translations
Bible translations into English